The Birth EP was Rasco's second solo album. Released from Stones Throw Records, Rasco signed a deal with Copasetik Records. Planet Asia with Richness cameo and the Molemen's His-Panik and Protest on production.

Track listing

1999 EPs
Rasco albums